Sree Guruvayoorappan is a 1964 Indian Malayalam-language film, directed by S. Ramanathan and produced by K. S. Ganapathy. The film stars Kaduvakulam Antony, Thikkurissy Sukumaran Nair, Kamala and Kedamangalam Sadanandan. The film had musical score by V. Dakshinamoorthy.

Cast
 
Thikkurissy Sukumaran Nair
Prem Nawas  
Kamala 
Kedamangalam Sadanandan 
Pappukutty Bhagavathar 
T. S. Muthaiah 
Kaduvakulam Antony 
Ambika 
Devaki 
Kushalakumari
Pandaribhai
Panjabi
S. P. Pillai 
Baby Vinodini 

Lalitha Ramanathan

Soundtrack
The music was composed by V. Dakshinamoorthy and the lyrics were written by Abhayadev.

References

External links
 

1964 films
1960s Malayalam-language films
Films directed by S. Ramanathan